Delia montezumae is a species of root fly from Delia genus, Anthomyiidae family, described by Griffiths in the year 1991.

References 

Anthomyiidae
Insects described in 1991
Diptera of Europe